Daniel Stephen (born 23 April 1976) is a South African former cricketer. He played in one first-class match for Border in 1995/96.

See also
 List of Border representative cricketers

References

External links
 

1976 births
Living people
South African cricketers
Border cricketers
Sportspeople from Qonce